Strathern is a suburb of New Zealand's southernmost city, Invercargill.

Demographics

Strathern had a population of 2,217 at the 2018 New Zealand census, an increase of 129 people (6.2%) since the 2013 census, and an increase of 36 people (1.7%) since the 2006 census. There were 951 households. There were 1,056 males and 1,164 females, giving a sex ratio of 0.91 males per female. The median age was 37.4 years (compared with 37.4 years nationally), with 423 people (19.1%) aged under 15 years, 465 (21.0%) aged 15 to 29, 948 (42.8%) aged 30 to 64, and 384 (17.3%) aged 65 or older.

Ethnicities were 85.1% European/Pākehā, 20.6% Māori, 6.4% Pacific peoples, 4.2% Asian, and 1.9% other ethnicities (totals add to more than 100% since people could identify with multiple ethnicities).

The proportion of people born overseas was 10.7%, compared with 27.1% nationally.

Although some people objected to giving their religion, 51.3% had no religion, 34.9% were Christian, 0.8% were Hindu, 0.1% were Muslim, 0.4% were Buddhist and 2.8% had other religions.

Of those at least 15 years old, 171 (9.5%) people had a bachelor or higher degree, and 537 (29.9%) people had no formal qualifications. The median income was $26,300, compared with $31,800 nationally. 135 people (7.5%) earned over $70,000 compared to 17.2% nationally. The employment status of those at least 15 was that 867 (48.3%) people were employed full-time, 237 (13.2%) were part-time, and 96 (5.4%) were unemployed.

Education
Te Kura o Whare Pā is a contributing primary school for years 1 to 6 with a roll of  students as of  The school was created as Fernworth Primary in 2005 with the merger of St George School and Elston Lea. In 2020, the school was renamed to Te Kura o Whare Pā.

References

Suburbs of Invercargill